The 1974 Stadthalle Open was a men's tennis tournament played on indoor hard courts at the Wiener Stadthalle in Vienna in Austria that was part of the 1974 Commercial Union Assurance Grand Prix. It was the inaugural edition of the tournament and was held from 28 October through 3 November 1974. Unseeded Vitas Gerulaitis won the singles title.

Finals

Singles

 Vitas Gerulaitis defeated  Andrew Pattison 6–4, 3–6, 6–3, 6–2 
 It was Gerulaitis' 3rd title of the year and the 3rd of his career.

Doubles

 Raymond Moore /  Andrew Pattison defeated  Bob Hewitt /  Frew McMillan 6–4, 5–7, 6–4 
 It was Moore's 2nd title of the year and the 2nd of his career. It was Pattison's 3rd title of the year and the 4th of his career.

References

External links
 ATP tournament profile

 
Stadthalle Open
Vienna Open